= Shop It To Me =

Personal shopping website

Shop It To Me is a member-only personal shopping website for discounted clothing, shoes and accessories. Members must indicate clothing brand preferences and size preferences to see discounted items. The website aggregates discounted items from online retailer websites based on the member's brand and size preferences and sends the items in an email newsletter each morning called Salemail. Clicking an item in Salemail links directly to one of Shop It To Me's retail partners where the item can be purchased.

== History ==
Shop It To Me was founded by Charlie Graham while he was a student at Harvard Business School in 2004. In 2007 the company raised an undisclosed amount of angel funding. Shop It To Me has 20 employees and over 4 million members.

In 2012, Shop It To Me launched a personalization engine on its website called Threads. Threads allows Shop It To Me members to indicate clothing trends, styles and price preferences and populates the results in a personalized feed.

In November 2013, Shop It To Me launched an iOS app for iPhone and iPad allowing its members to browse discounted items from a mobile device.
